William Henry Harrison Wroe (June 14, 1831August 6, 1897) was an American businessman and Republican politician.  He served one term in the Wisconsin State Assembly, representing southern Outagamie County.

Biography
Wroe was born on June 14, 1831 in New York City. Later, he settled in Geneva, Wisconsin, before moving to Medina, Outagamie County, Wisconsin. He was a merchant by trade. He was a member of the Assembly in 1872. In addition, he was Treasurer and Postmaster of Medina and a justice of the peace. He was a Republican.

Wroe suffered from diabetes for several years and died at Antigo, Wisconsin, in 1897.

References

|-

Politicians from New York City
People from Geneva, Wisconsin
People from Medina, Outagamie County, Wisconsin
Republican Party members of the Wisconsin State Assembly
City and town treasurers in the United States
Wisconsin postmasters
American justices of the peace
Businesspeople from Wisconsin
19th-century American merchants
1831 births
Year of death missing